The Atlantic was made by Atlantic AG für Automobilbau, Berlin, from 1921 to 1923. It was a single-track car with two auxiliary side wheels and a two-seat tandem body. An air-cooled 2-cylinder 1.8/6.5PS engine was used.

References
 "Atlantic", in G.N. Georgano, ed., The Complete Encyclopedia of Motorcars 1885-1968  (New York: E.P. Dutton and Co., 1974).

Defunct motor vehicle manufacturers of Germany